Now That's What I Call Music! 59 or Now 59 refers to at least two Now That's What I Call Music! series albums, including

Now That's What I Call Music! 59 (UK series)
Now That's What I Call Music! 59 (U.S. series)